Dioon merolae is a species of cycad that is native to Chiapas and Oaxaca, Mexico. It is known from the municipalities of Cintalapa and Villaflores in Chiapas, and from the Sierra Juárez, Oaxaca.

Gallery

References

External links
 
 

merolae
Endemic flora of Mexico
Flora of Chiapas
Flora of Oaxaca
Plants described in 1981
Flora of the Sierra Madre de Oaxaca
Sierra Madre de Chiapas